The Philippines competed at the 1928 Summer Olympics in Amsterdam, Netherlands.

Medalists

Athletics

Men
Track & road events

Field events

Swimming

Men

References

Philippine Sports Commission
Official Olympic Reports
International Olympic Committee results database

Nations at the 1928 Summer Olympics
1928
Summer Olympics